Amaury Pierron (born 4 March 1996) is a French downhill mountain biker. In 2019, he finished third in the UCI Downhill World Championships in Mont-Sainte-Anne, Canada. He also won three rounds and the overall classification of the 2018 UCI Downhill World Cup. In the 2019 edition, he again won three rounds but finished second overall to Loïc Bruni. His older brother Baptiste and his younger brother Antoine also compete in downhill racing.

References

External links

Living people
Downhill mountain bikers
1996 births
French male cyclists
French mountain bikers